Sezen Djouma (born 2002) is an English actress, known for Grandpa in My Pocket, a children's television series that aired from 2009 till 2014 on CBeebies.

Djouma has also appeared in ITV's programme, Keep It in the Family, and made brief appearances in soap operas like EastEnders.

Djouma has also done some live theatre work her name, including West End Live 2016 and performances in theatres like The Hackney Empire. She has been in a musical about young people, titled #OurStory.

She performed at Move It Dance Exhibition's 'Main Stage' twice, (2016, 2017). Djouma attends Spirit Young Performers Company.

References

Living people
British child actresses
British television actresses
British stage actresses
2002 births